K. sinensis may refer to:

Knoellia sinensis, a Gram-positive bacterium.
Kunpengopterus sinensis, an extinct wukongopterid pterosaur in the genus Kunpengopterus.
Kurzia sinensis, a species of liverworts.